Hans Warren Christie (born 4 November 1975) is a British-Canadian television and film actor known for his roles as Ray Cataldo on the ABC drama October Road and as Aidan "Greggy" Stiviletto on the ABC series Happy Town. More recently, Christie starred as Cameron Hicks in the SyFy series Alphas.

He recurs on the Fox series The Resident and costarred on the 2019 NBC series The Village. He also appeared in Batwoman as Bruce Wayne / Batman / Tommy Elliott / Hush.

Background
Warren Christie was born in Belfast, Northern Ireland, but spent most of his childhood in London, Ontario.  He left London for the University of Windsor after being recruited to play college football. It was during his years at Windsor that Christie developed an interest in performing and decided to pursue it as a career. This led to a move to Vancouver, where he soon found acting opportunities. He now lives in Vancouver, married to actress Sonya Salomaa.

Career
In 2007, Christie landed a lead role on the series October Road, playing a cocky construction company owner. In the same year, he was cast as the star of the musical feature film Magic Flute Diaries, based on one of Mozart's operas. In 2008, Christie was involved in an ABC pilot, Prince of Motor City, a gothic family drama in which he stars alongside Aiden Quinn and Piper Perabo.

Christie has taken on a variety of roles in different genres. He played opposite Heather Graham in the romantic comedy Gray Matters, and then appeared in the psychological thriller Beneath, produced by the group that made Napoleon Dynamite in conjunction with MTV Films/Paramount Classics.

Christie has also been involved in numerous television shows, including the unsuccessful ABC series The Days, and guest appearances in Supernatural, The L Word and Battlestar Galactica, before gaining more consistent work. He starred as Cameron Hicks on Syfy's  series, Alphas.

In May 2020, it was revealed during the season one finale of Batwoman, that Christie had been cast as Bruce Wayne, when he portrayed Tommy Elliot disguised as Wayne. This marks Christie as the second actor to portray the character within the Arrowverse alongside Kevin Conroy who played an alternate Earth version of the character during the Crisis on Infinite Earths event.

Filmography

References

External links
 

1975 births
Living people
Male film actors from Northern Ireland
Male television actors from Northern Ireland
Northern Ireland emigrants to Canada
Male actors from Belfast
Male actors from London, Ontario
Male actors from Vancouver
University of Windsor alumni
21st-century male actors from Northern Ireland
21st-century Canadian male actors